Euplotes dragescoi is a species of littoral ciliates, first found near King George Island.

References

Further reading
Paiva, T. S., and I. D. Silva-Neto. "NEW RECORD AND NOTES ON TROPHIC ACTIVITY OF THE BENTHIC CILIATE PSEUDOKAHLIELLA MARINA (CILIOPHORA, STICHOTRICHIA) IN THE COAST OF RIO DE JANEIRO."
Olmo, José L., and Genoveva Esteban. "New observations of the colpodid ciliate Ottowphrya dragescoi (Ciliophora, Colpodea, Platyophryida, Ottowphryidae) and its confusing taxonomic history." Boletin de la Real Sociedad Espanola de Historia Natural. Seccion biologica: organo del Instituto de Ciencias Naturales Jose de Acosta 108 (2014): 65-71.

External links

Species described in 2008
Hypotrichea